The , also called the  is a Grade 1 flat horse race in Japan for three-year-old thoroughbred colts and fillies run over a distance of 2,400 metres (approximately 1 mile 4 furlongs) at the Tokyo Racecourse, Fuchū, Tokyo in late May or early June.

It was first run in 1932 and is the Japanese equivalent of the English Epsom Derby. It is the second leg of the Japanese Triple Crown, preceded by the Satsuki Shō (the Japanese equivalent of the English 2,000 Guineas) in mid-late April and followed by the Kikuka Shō (the Japanese equivalent of the English St. Leger Stakes) in mid-late October.

Since 2010, the Tokyo Yūshun (along with several other JRA Japanese domestic Grade 1 races, including the other Japanese classics such as the Satsuki Shō and the Kikuka Shō) is open to international competition due to Japan's inclusion in the International Federation of Horseracing Authorities' ICS Part I category, in which all graded black-type races in the JRA calendar are open to international competition. Races prior to 2001 (along with the other Japanese classics) were only limited to Japanese-bred horses. Since 2001, foreign-bred horses are allowed, but until 2010 this race (and the other classics) were only limited to Japanese-trained horses. The current rule allows fielding at most seven entries either not bred/trained in Japan.

Step races 

If horses from the National Association of Racing win any 3-year-old JRA Grade 2 or 3 races before the Derby, they will be eligible to enter the Japanese Derby if ranked high enough in prize money. Priority entry rights cannot be applied to them; should they finish in such position in such races, extra entry right will be given out to Kyoto Shimbun Hai (at most of two).

The Satsuki Shō, the Aoba Shō and the Principal Stakes are the official trial races for the Japanese Derby. The top five finishers in the Satsuki Shō, the top two finishers in the Aoba Shō and the winner of the Principal Stakes are guaranteed a place in the field for the Derby, regardless of prize money. Overall, there are seven automatic qualifying spots in the Derby; the other 10 entries are "at-large" horses determined by prize money earned prior to racing in the Derby. The Kyoto Shimbun Hai is officially considered a step race even though it does not normally give entry rights. The NHK Mile Cup, the only non-Triple Crown three-year-old GI horse race, is not an official step race, but has gained importance in recent years as horses such as Tanino Gimlet (2002), King Kamehameha (2004, won) and Deep Sky (2008, won) participated in that race and would eventually win the Derby.

Winners since 1990

Earlier winners 

 1932 - Wakataka
 1933 - Kabutoyama
 1934 - Fray Mor
 1935 - Governor
 1936 - Tokumasa
 1937 - Hisatomo
 1938 - Sugenuma
 1939 - Kumohata
 1940 - Ieryu
 1941 - St Lite
 1942 - Minami Homare
 1943 - Kurifuji
 1944 - Kaiso
 1945 - No race
 1946 - No race
 1947 - Matsu Midori
 1948 - Miharu O
 1949 - Tachikaze
 1950 - Kumono Hana
 1951 - Tokino Minoru
 1952 - Kurino Hana
 1953 - Bostonian
 1954 - Golden Wave
 1955 - Otokitsu
 1956 - Hakuchikara
 1957 - Hikaru Meiji
 1958 - Daigo Homare
 1959 - Komatsu Hikari
 1960 - Kodama
 1961 - Hakusho
 1962 - Fair Win
 1963 - Meizui
 1964 - Shinzan
 1965 - Keystone
 1966 - Teito O
 1967 - Asa Denko
 1968 - Tanino Harromore
 1969 - Daishin Volgard
 1970 - Tanino Moutiers
 1971 - Hikaru Imai
 1972 - Long Ace
 1973 - Take Hope
 1974 - Colonel Lancer
 1975 - Kaburaya O
 1976 - Climb Kaiser
 1977 - Lucky Ruler
 1978 - Sakura Shori
 1979 - Katsurano Haiseiko
 1980 - Opec Horse
 1981 - Katsu Top Ace
 1982 - Bamboo Atlas
 1983 - Mr. C.B.
 1984 - Symboli Rudolf
 1985 - Sirius Symboli
 1986 - Dyna Gulliver
 1987 - Merry Nice
 1988 - Sakura Chiyono O
 1989 - Winner's Circle

See also
 Horse racing in Japan
 List of Japanese flat horse races

References 
Racing Post: 

Horse races in Japan
Turf races in Japan
Flat horse races for three-year-olds